Erzurum Gençlik Spor Kulübü is a multi-sports club established on March 14, 1995 by the Youth and Sport Directoriate (Erzurum GSİM) in Erzurum, Turkey. The club's colors are blue and white. Erzurum Gençlik SK is active in more than 30 branches, including many Olympic sports.

Venues
Main venues of the club are:
 Erzurum GSIM Ice Arena: Ice hockey arena with 3,000 seating capacity, home of men's ice hockey team 
 Erzurum GSIM Ice Arena: Ice hockey arena with 500 seating capacity, home of women's ice hockey team 
 GSIM Yenişehir Ice Hockey Hall: ice skating and ice hockey rink with 2,000 seating capacity
 Milli Piyango Curling Arena: curling arena with 1,000 seating capacity
 Kiremitliktepe Ski Jump: Two competition jump towers of K-125 and K-95 as well as three training jump towers of K-65, K-40 and K-20 for ski jumping

Teams

Curling
The women's team plays in the Turkish Curling Women's League.

In 2011, the women's team won the Federation Cup defeating Erzurum Çelebi SK in the final. They became champion at the 2011-12 Turkish Curling Women's League before Erzurum Çelebi SK.

Ice hockey
The men's team plays in the Turkish Ice Hockey Super League and the women's team in the Turkish Ice Hockey Women's League.

Volleyball
The women's team plays in the Turkish Women's Third League.

References

Sport in Erzurum
Sports clubs established in 1995
1995 establishments in Turkey
Multi-sport clubs in Turkey
Curling in Turkey
Ice hockey teams in Turkey